"On Language & the Irish Nation" was the title of a radio address made by Éamon de Valera, then Taoiseach of Ireland, on Raidió Éireann on St. Patrick's Day (17 March) 1943. It is often called The Ireland that we dreamed of, a phrase which is used within it, or the "comely maidens" speech, a misquotation. The speech marked the 50th anniversary of the foundation of the Gaelic League (Conradh na Gaeilge), a group promoting Irish culture and the Irish language. In the most frequently quoted passage of the speech, de Valera set out his vision of an ideal Ireland:

De Valera had made an annual radio speech on St Patrick's Day since coming to power after the 1932 election. At the time the 1943 speech was made, the Second World War was raging and the threat of German invasion (Operation Green) or British re-occupation (Plan W) was very real.

The 1943 speech in later years has been critiqued and often derided as archetypal of de Valera's traditionalist view of an isolationist, agricultural land where women held a traditional role. The phrase most commonly cited in this regard is the misquotation "comely maidens dancing at the crossroads". The speech in fact made no mention of crossroads dances, a rural tradition then dying out. Although de Valera actually said "happy maidens" in the broadcast, the phrase was "comely maidens" in the prepared text sent in advance to the newspapers, printed in the following day's Irish Press, and reprinted in Maurice Moynihan's 1980 anthology. It was a double LP record of speeches from the RTÉ archives, released in 1982 on the centenary of de Valera's birth, which brought the correct wording back to public notice.

In 2007, J. J. Lee and Diarmaid Ferriter argued for a reappraisal of the speech in the light of the Celtic Tiger consumption bubble and the Moriarty Tribunal revelations of corruption by 1980s Taoiseach Charles Haughey. Similarly, David McCullagh in 2018 suggests that its advocacy of "frugal comfort" was motivated by egalitarianism: "to ensure a minimum for everyone, the better off would have to accept a lower standard of living". Lee suggested de Valera's "Victorian language" gave his vision an antiquated tone that hid the continuing relevance of much of its vision. Ferriter called it "the most famous broadcast by any Irish politician of the twentieth century".

Sources
Primary

Secondary

References

External links
 “The Ireland That We Dreamed Of” 1943 RTÉ archives

1943 in Ireland
1943 speeches
March 1943 events
Éamon de Valera
RTÉ history
RTÉ Radio 1 programmes
Political manifestos
Irish nationalism